Paris Bass (born August 29, 1995) is an American professional basketball player for the Wisconsin Herd of the NBA G League. He played college basketball for the Detroit Mercy Titans.

High school career
Bass attended Seaholm High School (Head Coach Jose Andrades) in Birmingham, Michigan . As a senior, he averaged 23.4 points and 12.4 rebounds per game. Bass earned Basketball Coaches Association of Michigan (BCAM) All-State Team and the Detroit News All-Metro North First Team honors. Regarded as a three-star recruit by Rivals.com, Bass committed to play college basketball at Detroit Mercy.

College career
Bass redshirted his true freshman season. As a redshirt freshman, he averaged 12.4 points, 5.7 rebounds and 1.9 assists per game. Bass was named Horizon League Freshman of the Year. He missed the first eight games of his sophomore season with a suspension. Bass averaged 18.4 points, 8 rebounds and 2.1 assists per game as a sophomore, earning First-team All-Horizon League honors.On May 10, 2016, Bass was removed from the Detroit Mercy program.

Professional career

Austria and NBA D-League (2016–2017)
On July 27, 2016, Bass signed his first professional contract with the Traiskirchen Lions of the Austrian Basketball Bundesliga. He did not make his debut for Traiskirchen. In February 2017, Bass signed with the Erie BayHawks of the NBA D-League. In 15 games, he averaged 3.9 points and 2.7 rebounds per game.

Dominican, Taiwan, Puerto Rico, and Colombia (2018–2021)
In 2018, Bass played for three teams in the Dominican Republic: El Million Yireh of the TBS, Titanes del Licey of the LNB, and Jose Horacio Rodriguez of the Superior Basketball Tournament of Espaillat (BSE).

Between November 17 and December 15, 2018, Bass played for Kinmen Kaoliang Liquor of the Taiwanese Super Basketball League.

In 2019, Bass played for four teams in the Dominican Republic: CDP Domingo Paulino Santiago of the Santiago League, Club Rafael Barias of the TBS, Jose Horacio Rodriguez of the BSE, and Indios de San Francisco de Macorís of the LNB. With Indios de San Francisco, he helped the team win the championship and was named MVP of the tournament and of the Final Series.

In January 2020, Bass re-joined CDP Domingo Paulino Santiago of the Santiago League and averaged 23.5 points, 12.2 rebounds, 3.0 assists and 1.3 steals per game. Bass joined the Atléticos de San Germán of the Puerto Rican Baloncesto Superior Nacional on March 5, 2020. In his first season with the team, he averaged 22.1 points and 10.6 rebounds per game. On September 24, 2020, Bass signed with Cimarrones del Choco of the Baloncesto Profesional Colombiano.

In March 2021, Bass re-joined CDP Domingo Paulino Santiago for a third stint. He also had a second stint with Club Rafael Barias between May 5 and June 1, 2021. He re-joined the Atléticos de San Germán in July 2021 and averaged 22.7 points per game during the season.

South Bay Lakers / Phoenix Suns (2021–2022)
In October 2021, Bass joined the South Bay Lakers of the NBA G League after a successful tryout. He was named to the NBA G League All-Showcase Team.

On December 31, 2021, Bass signed a 10-day contract with the Phoenix Suns via the hardship exemption. He signed a second 10-day contract with the Suns on January 12.

On January 22, 2022, Bass was reacquired by the South Bay Lakers.

Bass joined the Los Angeles Lakers' 2022 NBA Summer League roster. In his Lakers Summer League debut, Bass scored fifteen points, six rebounds, and three blocks in a 100–66 win against the Miami Heat.

Salt Lake City Stars (2022–2023)
On September 14, 2022, Bass signed with the Utah Jazz, but was waived 2 days later. On October 23, 2022, Bass joined the Salt Lake City Stars training camp roster. On January 1, 2023, Bass was waived.

Wisconsin Herd (2023–present)
On January 6, 2023, Bass was acquired by the Wisconsin Herd.  On February 11, 2023, he set the Herd record for highest amount of points scored in a single game with 50 points.

Career statistics

NBA

|-
| style="text-align:left;"| 
| style="text-align:left;"| Phoenix
| 2 || 0 || 3.5 || .333 || .000 || 1.000 || 2.0 || .0 || .5 || .0 || 3.0
|- class="sortbottom"
| style="text-align:center;" colspan="2"| Career
| 2 || 0 || 3.5 || .333 || .000 || 1.000 || 2.0 || .0 || .5 || .0 || 3.0

References

External links
Detroit Mercy Titans bio

1995 births
Living people
American expatriate basketball people in Colombia
American expatriate basketball people in the Dominican Republic
American expatriate basketball people in Taiwan
American men's basketball players
Basketball players from Michigan
Detroit Mercy Titans men's basketball players
Erie BayHawks (2008–2017) players
People from Birmingham, Michigan
Phoenix Suns players
Salt Lake City Stars players
Small forwards
South Bay Lakers players
Undrafted National Basketball Association players